The 7th Robert Awards ceremony was held in 1990 in Copenhagen, Denmark. Organized by the Danish Film Academy, the awards honoured the best in Danish and foreign film of 1989.

Honorees

Best Danish Film 
 Waltzing Regitze – Kaspar Rostrup

Best Screenplay 
 Åke Sandgren & Stig Larsson – The Miracle in Valby

Best Actor in a Leading Role 
 Frits Helmuth – Waltzing Regitze

Best Actress in a Leading Role 
 Ghita Nørby – Waltzing Regitze

Best Actor in a Supporting Role 
 Tom McEwan –

Best Actress in a Supporting Role 
 Helle Ryslinge -

Best Cinematography 
 Dan Laustsen – The Miracle in Valby

Best Production Design 
 Henning Bahs – The Miracle in Valby

Best Costume Design 
 Manon Rasmussen – The Miracle in Valby

Best Makeup 
 Birthe Lyngsøe & Lene Ravn Henriksen – Waltzing Regitze

Best Sound Design 
 Niels Arild Nielsen –

Best Editing 
 Birger Møller Jensen –

Best Score 
 Thomas Koppel –

Best Documentary Short 
 Med døden inde på livet – Dola Bonfils

Best Foreign Film 
 A Short Film About Killing – Krzysztof Kieślowski

See also 

 1990 Bodil Awards

References

External links 
  

1989 film awards
1990 in Denmark
Robert Awards ceremonies
1990s in Copenhagen